Born Under a Bad Sign is the second compilation album by American blues musician Albert King, released in August 1967 by Stax Records. It features eleven electric blues songs that were recorded from March 1966 to June 1967, throughout five different sessions. King played with two in-house bands: Booker T. & the M.G.'s and the Memphis Horns. Although the album failed to reach any music chart, it did receive positive reviews from music critics and is often cited as one of the greatest blues albums ever made. Born Under a Bad Sign influenced many guitarists, including Eric Clapton, Mike Bloomfield, Jimi Hendrix, and Stevie Ray Vaughan. Born Under a Bad Sign has been recognized by several music institutions, and has been inducted into the Blues Foundation Hall of Fame, the Grammy Hall of Fame, and the National Recording Registry.

Recording and music
In 1966, King signed with the Memphis-based label Stax Records. The 43-year-old musician had already recorded music for other labels, but outside of his 1961 song "Don't Throw Your Love on Me So Strong", he had yet to find any commercial success. Throughout five sessions from March 1966 to June 1967, King recorded several songs at Stax Studios with two in-house bands: Booker T. & the M.G.'s and the Memphis Horns. Although Jim Stewart is credited as the producer, trumpeter Wayne Jackson said Steve Cropper and Al Jackson Jr. ran the recording sessions. Many of the songs recorded during these sessions were released as singles, and in August 1967, the singles were compiled and released as King's debut album with Stax, titled Born Under a Bad Sign.

Born Under a Bad Sign is an electric blues album, with influences of soul and funk. The album's music comprises simple chord progressions, which Jackson noted was due to inexperience. "We didn't know how to play it any better!" said Jackson. King played primarily on the three highest guitar strings and only used a select few phrases throughout the album. In the liner notes for the 2002 reissue of Born Under a Bad Sign, critic Michael Point wrote how King was able to distinguish his guitar play despite only using a few phrases: "His simple but subtle reconfigurations were accomplished through inflections, emphasis, and timing, not via sprinting through scales."

The sharp guitar sound heard throughout the album can be partially attributed to King's unorthodox style of play. King was left-handed, but chose to play a right-handed Gibson Flying V and not restring it. King pulled strings from above instead of pushing from below, the standard string bending technique. As a result, he was able to bend several strings simultaneously, which allowed for multi-timbral phrasing. When asked about King's style of play, Jackson said: "Albert's guitar was always out of tune with everything else, but he was such a strong man he would just bend the notes back in!"

Side one of Born Under a Bad Sign features six short songs, which are all under three minutes long. Side two features longer, more ballad-like songs. "Personal Manager" in particular contains one of the few guitar solos on the album. Arguably the most famous song from Born Under a Bad Sign is the album's title track, which was written by William Bell and Booker T. Jones. Bell wanted to write a song about astrology and came up with an unconventional ten-bar guitar line (as opposed to eight-bar and twelve-bar blues) during a jam session. Music historian Rob Bowman called "Born Under a Bad Sign" "one of the most smokingly intense blues recordings of the modern era".

Release and reception
Born Under a Bad Sign was released in August 1967 by Stax Records. It failed to reach any music chart, although three songs from the album—"Laundromat Blues" (1966), "Born Under a Bad Sign", and "Crosscut Saw" (both 1967)—did reach the Hot Rhythm & Blues Singles chart. Rob Bowman believes this was because the rhythm and blues market emphasized 45 rpm singles as opposed to albums. A critic from Billboard magazine awarded the album a "Special Merit Pick" label, and wrote: "Albert King has a way with the blues, a realistic, soulful style which hits the mark as all 11 cuts in his latest Stax album demonstrate."

Born Under a Bad Sign was reissued in 2013 by Stax and Concord Records. The reissue features remastered versions of every song from the original release, as well as four alternative versions, one untitled instrumental piece, and additional liner notes. Neil Kelly of PopMatters felt the additional song was enough to warrant a repurchase, and highlighted the instrumental piece. Kelly said: "Booker T and the MG's never sounded better, even on a one-off jam that was never supposed to be issued."

Legacy

Decades after its release, Born Under a Bad Sign status continues to grow, and it is now considered one of the greatest blues albums ever made. The Rolling Stone Jazz & Blues Album Guide gave Born Under a Bad Sign a perfect score, where author David McGee described it as "a blues monument". Leland Rucker echoed McGee's remark in the MusicHound Blues: The Essential Album Guide book, writing "King's Stax debut Born Under a Bad Sign is an undisputed classic." Stephen Thomas Erlewine of AllMusic highlighted the musicianship between King and the M.G.'s, and wrote: "it's astounding how strong this catalog of songs is".

Erlwine noted how influential the guitar play on the album was. "[King] unleashed a torrent of blistering guitar runs that were profoundly influential, not just in blues, but in rock & roll". Journalist Sean McDevitt agreed with this statement, and wrote "Born Under a Bad Sign directly influenced legions of guitar players who studied its every subtlety and nuance". Among these guitarists are Eric Clapton, Mike Bloomfield, Jimi Hendrix, and Stevie Ray Vaughan, most of whom covered songs from Born Under a Bad Sign. Clapton's band Cream sampled the guitar solo from "Oh, Pretty Woman" for the song "Strange Brew", and covered "Born Under a Bad Sign" for their 1968 album Wheels of Fire. The Paul Butterfield Blues Band also covered "Born Under a Bad Sign" for the 1967 album The Resurrection of Pigboy Crabshaw.

Born Under a Bad Sign has been recognized by several music institutions as an influential album. It has been inducted into the Blues Foundation Hall of Fame and the Grammy Hall of Fame, and the National Recording Registry. The 2002 reissue received a Blues Music Award for "Historical Blues Album of the Year". In 2012, Rolling Stone ranked Born Under a Bad Sign at number 491 on its list of the 500 greatest albums of all time. The list states: "King's first album for the Stax label combines his hard, unflashy guitar playing with the sleek sound of the label's house band, Booker T. and the MG's."

Michael Point believes Born Under a Bad Sign was critical to the modernization of blues music, and catapulted King into mainstream popularity. King went from playing on the Chitlin' Circuit as a relatively unknown musician, to large rock arenas such as the Fillmore and Fillmore East. These performances attracted both black and white audience members, including a large following of hippie fans.

Track listing
Track listing taken from the 1967 vinyl release of Born Under a Bad Sign.

Personnel
Credits adapted from the liner notes of Born Under a Bad Sign.
 Albert King  lead guitar, vocals
 Booker T. Jones  keyboards, organ, piano
 Isaac Hayes  keyboards, piano
 Steve Cropper  rhythm guitar
 Donald Dunn  bass guitar
 Al Jackson Jr.  drums
 Wayne Jackson  trumpet
 Andrew Love  tenor saxophone
 Joe Arnold  baritone saxophone, flute

References

Notes

Footnotes

1967 compilation albums
Albert King albums
Albums produced by Jim Stewart (record producer)
Grammy Hall of Fame Award recipients
Stax Records albums
United States National Recording Registry recordings
United States National Recording Registry albums